Kendall Arkel Langford (born January 27, 1986) is a former American football defensive end. He played college football at Hampton, and was drafted by the Dolphins in the third round of the 2008 NFL Draft. He has also played for the St. Louis Rams, Indianapolis Colts, New Orleans Saints, and Houston Texans.

Early years
Langford attended and played high school football at Petersburg (Va.) High School. He was earned First-team All-District honors as a junior in 2002, as well as First-team All-District, Second-team All-Metro, and Second-team All-Region honors as a senior.

College career
After high school, Langford attended and played college football at Hampton University, where he was a four-year letterman from 2004 to 2007. He was also recruited by Virginia, Virginia Tech, Morgan State as well as other Division I-AA schools.

In 12 games (three starts) for the Pirates as a freshman in 2004, Langford earned Freshman all-American honors after recording 44 tackles (15 solo), 11.5 tackles for a loss, 4.5 sacks, seven quarterback pressures, two forced fumbles and a fumble recovery. In a game against South Carolina State, he recovered a fumble and returned it 30 yards for a touchdown.

As a sophomore in 2005, Langford started all 12 games for the Pirates at left defensive end. On the season he recorded 65 tackles (31 solo), 15.5 tackles for a loss, 4.5 sacks, 12 quarterback pressures, three forced fumbles, two blocked kicks and two passes defensed. For his efforts, Langford earned first-team All-MEAC honors. He earned MEAC Defensive Player of the Week honors in a game against Delaware State after racking up nine tackles (four solo), five tackles for a loss and three sacks.

Langford earned first-team All-MEAC honors for the second consecutive season as a junior in 2005. He started all 12 games for the Pirates at left defensive end, recording 55 tackles (32 solo), 16 tackles for a loss, 8.5 sacks, eight quarterback pressures, two forced fumbles, a blocked kick and a pass defensed. His tackle total led the Pirates' defensive lineman, while his sack total ranked third in the MEAC.

During his senior season at Hampton in 2007, Langford led the team with 72 tackles (32 solo) on his way to his third straight first-team All-MEAC selection. He also recorded 13.5 tackles for a loss, six sacks, 12 quarterback pressures, two forced fumbles, a blocked kick and a pass defensed. In a game against North Carolina A&T, Langford intercepted a Shelton Morgan pass and returned it 22 yards for his second career touchdown. Following his senior season, he appeared in the East-West Shrine Game and 2008 Senior Bowl.

After playing in 47 games for Hampton, Langford finished his collegiate career with 236 tackles (110 solo), 56.5 tackles for a loss, 23.5 sacks, 39 quarterback pressures, nine force fumbles, a fumble recovery, five pass deflections, an interception, five blocked kicks and two touchdowns.

College statistics

Professional career
Coming out of Hampton, Langford was projected by the majority of NFL draft experts and analysts to be a third or fourth round pick. He received an invitation to the NFL combine and completed all of the required combine drills. Langford had private workouts with the Detroit Lions, Miami Dolphins, Minnesota Vikings, Pittsburgh Steelers, and St. Louis Rams. He was ranked as the 11th best defensive end prospect in the draft by NFLDraftScout.com.

Miami Dolphins

Langford was drafted by the Miami Dolphins in the third round (66th overall) of the 2008 NFL Draft. He was the second of three defensive lineman taken by the Dolphins in the 2008 Draft, following Phillip Merling and preceding Lionel Dotson. He was projected as a defensive end in the Dolphins' 3–4 defense. Negotiations between the Dolphins and Langford's agent took place in June and lasted until he was signed to a multi-year deal on July 11.

St. Louis Rams
Langford signed with the St. Louis Rams on March 17, 2012. He was released by the team on February 26, 2015.

Indianapolis Colts
Langford signed with the Indianapolis Colts on March 10, 2015. On November 19, 2016, Langford was placed on injured reserve.

On August 9, 2017, Langford was released by the Colts after failing his physical.

New Orleans Saints
On September 21, 2017, Langford signed with the New Orleans Saints. He was released on October 4, 2017.

Houston Texans
On October 10, 2017, Langford signed with the Houston Texans. He was released on November 7, 2017.

Miami Dolphins (second stint)
On August 14, 2018, Langford signed with the Miami Dolphins. He was released on September 1, 2018.

Career statistics

Regular season

Postseason

References

External links
Hampton Pirates bio

1986 births
Living people
Sportspeople from Petersburg, Virginia
American football defensive tackles
American football defensive ends
Hampton Pirates football players
Miami Dolphins players
St. Louis Rams players
Indianapolis Colts players
New Orleans Saints players
Houston Texans players